The West Siberian Plain ( Zapadno-Sibirskaya ravnina) is a large plain that occupies the western portion of Siberia, between the Ural Mountains in the west and the Yenisei River in the east, and by the Altai Mountains on the southeast. Much of the plain is poorly drained and consists of some of the world's largest swamps and floodplains. Important cities include Chelyabinsk, Novosibirsk, Omsk, and Tomsk, as well as Surgut and Nizhnevartovsk.

Winters on the West Siberian Plain are harsh and long. The climate of most of the plain areas is either subarctic or continental. The plain had large petroleum and natural gas reserves. Most of Russia’s oil and gas production was extracted from this area during the 1970s and 80s.

Geography

The West Siberian Plain is located east of the Ural Mountains mostly in the territory of Russia. Besides the Yenisei, other main rivers in the West Siberian Plain are from west to east the Irtysh, Ob, Nadym, Pur and Taz. There are many lakes and swamps and large regions of the plains are flooded in the spring.

Together with its tributary Angara, the two rivers flow . The valley formed by the Yenisei acts as a rough dividing line between the West Siberian Plain and the Central Siberian Plateau. The Siberian Uvaly is a low hilly region stretching from east to west across the plain. Glacial deposits extend as far south as the Ob-Irtysh confluence, forming occasional low hills and ridges, including the Ob Plateau in the south, but otherwise the plain is exceedingly flat and featureless. The Ishim Plain and the Baraba Lowland in the south are important agricultural areas. There are salt lakes in the Kulunda Plain, which extends southwards into Kazakhstan and is limited to the south by the Kokshetau Hills. 

The West Siberian Plain is very swampy and soils are mostly peaty Histosols and, in the treeless northern part, Histels. is one of the world's largest areas of peatlands, which are characterized by raised bogs. There are numerous lakes in the vast interfluve swamps of the Ob-Taz floodplain.

Flora and fauna
The plain has eight distinct vegetation regions: tundra, forest-tundra, northern taiga, middle taiga, southern taiga, sub-taiga forest, forest-steppe, and steppe. The number of animal species in the West Siberian Plain ranges from at least 107 in the tundra to 278 or more in the forest-steppe region. In the south of the plain, where permafrost is largely absent, rich grasslands that are an extension of the Kazakh Steppe formed the original vegetation, which had almost all been cleared by the early 21st century.

Geology

The West Siberian Plain consists mostly of Cenozoic alluvial deposits and is extraordinarily flat. A rise of fifty metres in sea level would cause all land between the Arctic Ocean and the Ob-Irtysh confluence near Khanty-Mansiysk to be inundated (see also Turgai Straits, West Siberian Glacial Lake). It is a region of the Earth’s crust that has undergone prolonged subsidence and is composed of horizontal deposits from as much as 65 million years ago. Many of the deposits on this plain result from ice dams that reversed the flow of the Ob and Yenisei rivers, redirecting them into the Caspian Sea, and perhaps the Aral Sea as well.

See also

East European Plain, the other major plain of Russia
Eurasian steppe
South Siberian Mountains
West Siberian petroleum basin

References

External links
NASA Images: West Siberian Plain
Topography and Drainage of Russia
Peatlands of the World: Russia — Siberia

 
Eurasian Steppe
Forests of Russia
Grasslands of Russia
Tundra
Taiga and boreal forests
Temperate coniferous forests
Temperate grasslands, savannas, and shrublands